Persikoba stand for Persatuan Sepakbola Indonesia Kota Batu (en: Football Association of Batu City). Persikoba Batu City is an Indonesian football club based in Batu, East Java. They currently compete in the Liga 3.

References

External links
Liga-Indonesia.co.id

Batu, East Java
Football clubs in Indonesia
Football clubs in East Java
Association football clubs established in 2003
2003 establishments in Indonesia